Rudolph Joseph Williams (March 16, 1941 – January 30, 2015) was an American professional football player for the Winnipeg Blue Bombers, Ottawa Rough Riders and Toronto Argonauts in the Canadian Football League. He won the Grey Cup with Winnipeg in 1962. He played college football at the University of Iowa and also played for the Toronto Rifles of the Continental Football League. He died in 2015.

References

1941 births
Winnipeg Blue Bombers players
2015 deaths
University of Iowa alumni
People from New Jersey
Ottawa Rough Riders players
Toronto Argonauts players
Continental Football League players